"Here It Comes Again" is a song by British singer Melanie C. It was released as the lead single from her second album, Reason (2003), on 24 February 2003. The single was relatively well promoted on radio, TV shows, and magazine interviews, while also going into Europe to do some promotion. The single initially hit a midweek position of  4, but during the week, it fell down the chart and finished at No. 7. "Here It Comes Again" went on to be the 191st-highest-selling single of 2003 in the UK.

Music video
The music video was directed by Charles Infante on 17 November 2002 and was shot in Los Angeles. In the city, Melanie C is in the alleyway, singing. She is also near the bridge. A group of people runs through the bridge, passing Melanie over. The group arrives at the alleyway and they climb to the other side of the wall where Melanie is singing. The group again passes Melanie over. Melanie is then seen near the mountains. The same group of people also arrives there. The group finds Melanie and they watch the sunset as the video ends.

Track listings
 UK and Australian CD single
 "Here It Comes Again" (radio edit) — 4:04
 "Love to You" — 4:36
 "Like That" — 3:09

 UK cassette single, European and Canadian CD single
 "Here It Comes Again" (radio edit) — 4:04
 "Love to You" — 4:36

 UK DVD single
 "Here It Comes Again" (video)
 "Love to You"
 "Living without You"
 Behind the Scenes at "Here It Comes Again" video shoot

Credits and personnel
Credits are lifted from the Reason album booklet.

Studios
 Recorded at various studios in Los Angeles and London
 Mixed at O'Henry Sound Studios, 1808, Sound Gallery Studios (Los Angeles), and Mayfair Studios (London, England)
 Mastered at Metropolis Mastering (London, England)

Personnel

 Melanie C – writing
 Marius De Vries – writing, keyboards, programming, production, recording engineer
 Robert Howard – writing, additional backing vocals, guitar
 Milton McDonald – guitar
 Kim Khahn – bass
 Alexis Smith – keyboards, programming, recording engineer
 Steve Sidelnyk – drums
 Chris Elliott – string arrangement, conducting
 Gavyn Wright – concertmaster
 Pete Hofmann – additional drum programming, recording (drums)
 Pete Davis – additional programming
 Patrick McCarthy – mixing
 Tim Young – mastering

Charts

Weekly charts

Year-end charts

Release history

References

2003 singles
Melanie C songs
Song recordings produced by Marius de Vries
Songs written by Marius de Vries
Songs written by Melanie C
Virgin Records singles